The following is a summary of the 2018–19 season of competitive football in Switzerland.

National teams

Men's national team

2018–19 UEFA Nations League

2019 UEFA Nations League Finals

UEFA Euro 2020 qualifying

Friendly matches

Women's national team

FIFA Women's World Cup 2019 qualification

Group stage

Play-offs

3–3 on aggregate. Switzerland won on away goals.

Netherlands won 4–1 on aggregate.

2019 Algarve Cup

Friendly matches

League season

Raiffeisen Super League

Brack.ch Challenge League

Swiss clubs in Europe

UEFA Champions League

Qualifying phase and play-off round

Second qualifying round

|}

Play-off round

|}

Group stage

Group H

UEFA Europa League

Qualifying phase and play-off round

Second qualifying round

|}

Third qualifying round

|}

Play-off round

|}

Group stage

Group A

Knockout phase

Round of 32

|}

UEFA Women's Champions League

Qualifying round

Knockout phase

Round of 32

|}

Round of 16

|}

References

 
Seasons in Swiss football